2169 Taiwan, provisional designation , is a carbonaceous Astridian asteroid from the central regions of the asteroid belt, approximately 17 kilometers in diameter. It was discovered on 9 November 1964, by astronomers at the Purple Mountain Observatory near Nanking, China. It was named for Taiwan.

Orbit and classification 

Taiwan is a member of the Astrid family, a smaller asteroid family of nearly 500 carbonaceous asteroids. The family is located in the outermost central main-belt, near a prominent Kirkwood gap, that marks the 5:2 orbital resonance with Jupiter, and divides the asteroid belt into a central and outer part.

Taiwan orbits the Sun at a distance of 2.7–2.9 AU once every 4 years and 8 months (1,703 days). Its orbit has an eccentricity of 0.05 and an inclination of 2° with respect to the ecliptic.

Physical characteristics 

In the SMASS classification, and according to PanSTARRS photometric survey, Taiwan is a carbonaceous C-type asteroid.

Rotation period 

In September 2010, a rotational lightcurve of Taiwan was obtained from photometric observations in the R-band by astronomers at the Palomar Transient Factory in California. Lightcurve analysis gave a rotation period of 7.252 hours with a brightness variation of 0.17 magnitude.

Diameter and albedo 

According to the surveys carried out by the Japanese Akari satellite and the NEOWISE mission of NASA's Wide-field Infrared Survey Explorer, Taiwan measures between 16.52 and 19.263 kilometers in diameter and its surface has an albedo between 0.042 and 0.085.

The Collaborative Asteroid Lightcurve Link assumes a standard albedo for carbonaceous asteroids of 0.057 and calculates a diameter of 14.39 kilometers based on an absolute magnitude of 12.94.

Naming 

This minor planet was named after the Island of Taiwan (former Formosa). Taiwan, or the Republic of China, is a country southeast of mainland China. The official naming citation was published by the Minor Planet Center on 1 February 1980.

References

External links 
 Asteroid Lightcurve Database (LCDB), query form (info )
 Dictionary of Minor Planet Names, Google books
 Asteroids and comets rotation curves, CdR – Observatoire de Genève, Raoul Behrend
 Discovery Circumstances: Numbered Minor Planets (1)-(5000) – Minor Planet Center
 
 

002169
002169
Named minor planets
002169
19641109